Elizabeth Eva Leach  is a British musicologist and music theorist who specializes in medieval music, especially that of the fourteenth century.

Life and career
Leach is a professor of music at St Hugh's College, Oxford (a constituent college of the University of Oxford), where she lectures on the music of Guillaume de Machaut and the trouvères. She has written extensively on Machaut as well as birdsong and nature in the medieval music. In 2016 she was elected as a Fellow of the British Academy.
Music historian Alice V. Clark postulated that Leach's Guillaume de Machaut: Secretary, Poet, Musician will become will "likely become the standard monograph study of Machaut’s life and works".

Selected publications
Books

 
 
 
 
 

Chapters

 
 

Articles

References

External links
 
 
 
 

Living people
Fellows of St Hugh's College, Oxford
Fellows of the British Academy
Year of birth missing (living people)
Women musicologists
Machaut scholars